General Sir (John) Noel Thomas KCB DSO MC (28 February 1915 – 16 March 1983) was a Master-General of the Ordnance.

Military career
Thomas was commissioned into the Royal Engineers in 1936.

He served in World War II latterly as Commander Royal Engineers for the Guards Armoured Division in North West Europe.

He was appointed General Officer Commanding 42nd (Lancashire) Division/District of the Territorial Army in 1963 and then became Director of Combat Development (Army) at the Ministry of Defence in 1965. He was appointed Deputy Chief of the Defence Staff (Operational Requirements) in 1968 and Master-General of the Ordnance in 1971; in this capacity he was also a member of the Procurement Executive Organisation formed by Prime Minister Edward Heath that year. He retired in 1974.

He also served as Colonel of the Royal Pioneer Corps from 1968 to 1976.

References

 

|-

|-
 

|-

1915 births
1983 deaths
British Army generals
British Army personnel of World War II
Royal Engineers officers
Knights Commander of the Order of the Bath
Companions of the Distinguished Service Order
Recipients of the Military Cross
Royal Pioneer Corps officers